Radkan (also Romanized as Rādkān and Rādekān; also known as Rādkān Bār Kalā) is a village in Chaharkuh Rural District, in the Central District of Kordkuy County, Golestan Province, Iran. At the 2006 census, its population was 323, in 74 families.

References 

Populated places in Kordkuy County